Hassan and Marcus is a 2008 Egyptian comedy-drama film directed by Ramy Imam.

Background
Being the first collaboration between Adel Emam and Omar Sharif, arguably the most prominent actors in Egypt and the Middle East, the movie was a much-anticipated summer blockbuster. However, its message proved so controversial that Facebook groups sporting Adel Emam's picture in Coptic garb called for a boycott of his movies, and the resulting emotional distress is reported to have prompted Imam to move from his home in Cairo to a summer house in Porto Marina, a resort on Egypt's northern coast. Imam, Sharif and other collaborators on the film have vehemently defended its content and criticised many conservatives and religious extremists who consider it blasphemous.

Plot
When the lives of Mahmoud, a Muslim sheikh (Omar Sharif) and Boulos, a Christian priest (Adel Emam) are threatened by religious extremists on both sides, the Egyptian government inducts them into a witness protection program that requires them to disguise themselves as the Christian, Marcus Abdel-Shahid, and a Muslim sheikh, Hassan el-Attar, respectively.

When, unwittingly, they move into the same building, a friendship blossoms that must, along with a romance between the protagonists' children, withstand the difficulties of prejudice and social persecution.

Hassan and Marcus do not attempt to name the reasons for the tension between Christians and Muslims but, according to the political writer and Coptic Christian Sameh Fawzi, the conflicts have nothing to do with religion.

Cast
 Adel Emam as Boulos/Hassan el Attar
 Omar Sharif as Mahmoud/Marcus
 Lebleba as Matilda/Zeenat
 Hana El Shorbagy as Khairia
 Mohamed Imam as Gerges/Emad
 Shery Adel as Mariam/Fatima

Themes
The film addresses issues of religious extremism, intolerance and sectarian violence, and emphasises the possibility of friendship and love between members of different religions.

Imam said of the film:

I have declared war using art against the extremists—against those who foment differences between us. I hope Christians and Muslims will leave the cinema and embrace one another.

Criticism

References

External links
 
 
 
 EGYPT: Groups accuse Muslim actor Adel Imam of apostasy

2008 films
2000s Arabic-language films
2008 comedy-drama films
Films set in Egypt
Egyptian comedy-drama films
Interfaith romance films
Films about terrorism in Africa
Films about witness protection